Race Rocks Light is one of the first two lighthouses that were built on the west coast of Canada, financed by the British Government and illuminated in 1860. It is the only lighthouse on that coast built of rock, (granite) purportedly quarried in Scotland, and topped with sandstone quarried on Gabriola Island.

History
The lighthouse was built between 1859–1860 by the crew of HMS Topaze and outside labourers under a contract awarded to John Morris by the British Government. It was illuminated on 26 December 1860, six weeks after the smaller Fisgard Island lighthouse built at the entrance to Esquimalt Harbour near Victoria.  In 2010, both lighthouses celebrated their sesquicentennial. See  A complete history of the Light Station and Ecological Reserve.

It has a 24.4 m (80 feet) cylindrical tower with black and white bands, and flashes a white light every 10 seconds. Its  foghorn sounds three blasts at one-minute intervals.

The lighthouse has been automated since 1997 at which time Lester B. Pearson College took over the management of the station and the surrounding Race Rocks Ecological Reserve.  Restoration of the interior and exterior of the historic light tower was carried out in 2009.

Oceanographic research

The Race Rocks Light is one of 12 lighthouses part of the British Columbia Shore Station Oceanographic Program, collecting coastal water temperature and salinity measurements everyday since 1921.

Keepers
  George Nicholas Davies (1861 – 1866)
 Thomas Argyle (1866 -1888, retired) 
 Albert Argyle (1888- 1889)
 W.P. Daykin (Dec. 6 1889 – Jan 1891 transferred to Carmanah)
 Frederick Mercer Eastwood (Jan 31 1891 – 1919)
 James Thomas Forsyth (1919 –1932)
 Henry I. McKenzie (1932 –1933)
 Andrew Ritchie (1933 – 1940) 
 Thomas Westhead (1940 – 1948)
 Arthur Anderson (1948 – 1950)
 Percival C. Pike (1950 – 1952)
 Gordon Odlum (1952 – 1961)
 Charles Clark (1961)
 Ben Rogers (1961 – 1964)
 J. Alan Tully (1964 – 1966)
 Trevor M. Anderson (1966 – 1982)
 Charles Redhead(1982 – 1989)
 Mike E. Slater (1989 – 1997)

See also
 List of lighthouses in British Columbia
 Race Rocks Tidal Power Demonstration Project

Notes

References

External links

 Aids to Navigation Canadian Coast Guard
Home page featuring history of the light station

Lighthouses completed in 1860
Lighthouses in British Columbia
Heritage sites in British Columbia
Lighthouses on the Canadian Register of Historic Places